In qualitative phenomenological research, lived experience refers to a representation of the experiences and choices of a given person, and the knowledge that they gain from these experiences and choices. It is a category of qualitative research together with those that focus on society and culture and those that focus on language and communication.

In the philosophy of Wilhelm Dilthey, the human sciences are based on lived experience, which makes them fundamentally different from the natural sciences, which are considered to be based on scientific experiences. The concept can also be approached from the view that since every experience has both objective and subjective components, it is important for a researcher to understand all aspects of it.

In phenomenological research, lived experiences are the main object of study, but the goal of such research is not to understand individuals' lived experiences as facts, but to determine the understandable meaning of such experiences. In addition, lived experience is not about reflecting on an experience while living through it but is recollective, with a given experience being reflected on after it has passed or been lived through.

The term dates back to the 19th century, but its use has increased greatly in recent decades. The concept has been criticised as solipsistic and redundant.

See also
 Anecdotal evidence

References

Phenomenological methodology
Qualitative research